Soestdijk Palace is a palace formerly belonging to the Dutch royal family. It consists of a central block and two wings.

Although named after the village of Soestdijk, which is largely in the municipality of Soest, the Soestdijk Palace is just north of the border in the municipality of Baarn in the province of Utrecht. It was the home for over six decades of Queen Juliana and her husband, Prince Bernhard until their deaths in 2004.

History

De Graeff 
In the middle of the seventeenth century the country house on the Zoestdijk was built for Cornelis de Graeff. In the years 1655–1660 De Graeff was involved in the education of Willem III of Orange, as can be seen from his letters in Soestdijk to the States-General and his nephew Johan de Witt. During the summers the family spent a lot of their time at the Palace Soestdijk, and De Graeff's sons Pieter and Jacob de Graeff played with the young Willem. In 1674, after the rampjaar, Jacob de Graeff sold it for the low price of 18,755 guilders to Stadhouder William III.

Orange-Nassau 
Then the palace originally started as a hunting lodge that was built between 1674 and 1678 by Maurits Post, who was also involved in building two other royal palaces, Huis ten Bosch Palace and Noordeinde Palace. William left the Netherlands in 1688 to reside in London as William III of England.

During the French invasion in 1795, the palace was seized as a spoil of war and turned into an inn for French troops. When Louis Bonaparte became King of Holland, he took possession of it and had it extended and refurnished.

It was presented to William II of the Netherlands in 1815 in recognition of his services at the Battle of Waterloo. From 1816 to 1821, the palace was significantly expanded by adding two wings, the northern or Baarn wing, and the southern or Soest wing. In 1842 its contents were enriched by the addition of the neoclassical furnishings of his former palace in Brussels, today the Palais des Académies.

Soestdijk became the property of the state of the Netherlands in 1971, although it was used by Princess Juliana (Queen of the Netherlands from 1948 to 1980) and Prince Bernhard as their official residence until both of their deaths in 2004. Soestdijk Palace then remained empty and unused for over a year before its opening to the public. From Spring 2006 to 2017, it was possible to visit, pending a decision about its future use.

Investors 
In 2017 the palace was sold to Made in Holland who plan on developing a hotel, event centre and 65 houses on the grounds. A forest, the Baarnse Bos, is adjacent to the palace. It was developed as a French landscape garden between 1733 and 1758.

References

External links

 Paleis Soestdijk (official website)

Baarn
Soestdijk, Palace
Houses completed in 1678
Palaces in the Netherlands
Rijksmonuments in Utrecht (province)
Royal residences in the Netherlands
Tourist attractions in Utrecht (province)
1678 establishments in the Dutch Republic